Gerson Bautista (born May 31, 1995) is a Dominican professional baseball pitcher for the Toros de Tijuana of the Mexican League. He made his Major League Baseball (MLB) debut with the New York Mets in 2018 and also played for the Seattle Mariners in 2019.

Career

Boston Red Sox
Bautista signed with the Boston Red Sox as an international free agent in April 2013. He made his professional debut with the DSL Red Sox in 2014 and spent the whole season there, posting a 2–1 record and 1.03 ERA in 13 games (12 starts). He spent 2015 with the GCL Red Sox where he was 3–3 with a 2.77 ERA in 12 games (11 starts), and 2016 with the Lowell Spinners and Greenville Drive, posting a combined 1–4 record, 2.55 ERA, and 1.08 WHIP in 23 total appearances out of the bullpen between the two teams. Bautista began 2017 with the Salem Red Sox.

New York Mets
On July 31, 2017, the Red Sox traded him along with Jamie Callahan and Stephen Nogosek to the New York Mets for Addison Reed. New York assigned him to the St. Lucie Mets and he finished the season there. In 37 total relief appearances between Salem and St. Lucie, he was 3–3 with a 4.22 ERA and 73 strikeouts in 59.2 innings. The Mets added him to their 40-man roster after the 2017 season.

Bautista started 2018 with the Binghamton Rumble Ponies before being promoted to the Las Vegas 51s. He was recalled by the Mets and made his Major League debut on April 17, 2018.

Seattle Mariners
On December 3, 2018, the Mets traded Bautista, Jay Bruce, Jarred Kelenic, Anthony Swarzak, and Justin Dunn to the Seattle Mariners for Edwin Díaz, Robinson Canó, and $20 million. He appeared in 8 games in 2019 for Seattle. Bautista was outrighted off of the 40-man roster on October 23, 2020. He became a free agent on November 2, 2020. On November 5, 2020, Bautista re-signed a minor league deal with the Mariners. On March 22, 2021, Bautista was released.

Diablos Rojos del México
On April 22, 2021, Bautista signed with the Diablos Rojos del México of the Mexican League. In 22 appearances out of the bullpen, Bautista posted a 1.99 ERA and 27 strikeouts over 22.2 innings.

San Francisco Giants
On July 19, 2021, Bautista's contract was purchased by the San Francisco Giants organization and he was assigned to the Triple-A Sacramento River Cats. Bautista made 9 appearances for Sacramento, going 1–3 with an ERA of 9.00 and striking out 10. On August 29, 2021, Bautista was released by the Giants.

Diablos Rojos del México (second stint)
On February 10, 2022, Bautista re-signed with the Diablos Rojos del México.

Mariachis de Guadalajara
On May 2, 2022, Bautista was traded to the Mariachis de Guadalajara of the Mexican League. In 5 appearances, he posted an 0–2 record with a 22.85 ERA. Bautista was released on May 14, 2022.

Toros de Tijuana
On February 11, 2023, Bautista signed with the Toros de Tijuana of the Mexican League.

References

External links

1995 births
Living people
Major League Baseball players from the Dominican Republic
Major League Baseball pitchers
New York Mets players
Seattle Mariners players
Dominican Republic expatriate baseball players in the United States
Dominican Republic expatriate baseball players in Mexico
Dominican Summer League Red Sox players
Gulf Coast Red Sox players
Lowell Spinners players
Greenville Drive players
Salem Red Sox players
St. Lucie Mets players
Binghamton Rumble Ponies players
Modesto Nuts players
Tacoma Rainiers players
Leones del Escogido players
Diablos Rojos del México players